Yahya ibn Ali ibn Hammud al-Mu'tali (died 1035) was Caliph of Cordoba in the Hammudid dynasty of the Al-Andalus (Moorish medieval Iberia) during two periods, from 1021 to 1023 and from 1025 to 1026. He was the son of caliph Ali ibn Hammud.

Biography
He was governor of Ceuta from 1016, a title he received from his father. After the latter's death, he refused to recognize his uncle al-Qasim al-Ma'mun as caliph. After reaching Málaga he moved to Córdoba with a Berber army. Al-Qasim abandoned the city, taking refuge in Seville; Yahya reigned until 1023, when al-Qasim took back the throne. The latter was in turn ousted by the Umayyad party, which raised Abd ar-Rahman V to the caliphate.

Yahya moved to Málaga, and captured al-Qasim at Jerez de la Frontera, having him executed. In 1025 he mustered another army to march on Córdoba where caliph Muhammad III, after news of the upcoming attack arrived, fled to Zaragoza. The Córdoban aristocracy created a council to govern the city in absence of a caliph; after some six months, however, they appealed to Yahya to enter the city and assume the title of caliph. He arrived on 9 November 1025; after a few days he left the government in the hands of his vizier Abu Ja`far Ahmad ben Musa while he returned to his secure stronghold of Málaga.

The riots which ensued in Córdoba caused the final end of the Hammudid dynasty. In June 1026 the people expelled Yahya's vizier and elected the last caliph, the Umayyad Hisham III.

After his definitive expulsion from Córdoba, Yahya created the independent taifa (kingdom) of Málaga, which he ruled until his death in 1035.

Sources

Hammudid caliphs of Córdoba
1035 deaths
11th-century caliphs of Córdoba
Year of birth unknown
Taifa of Málaga
11th-century Arabs